Allansford is a town in the Western District of Victoria, Australia.  It is in the City of Warrnambool local government area. The Hopkins River flows through the town.

Warrnambool Cheese and Butter is based in Allansford.

History
The Post Office opened on 1 January 1860

The railway through the town was opened in 1890, and the town was once served by a local railway station.

Today
A business park for Warrnambool is planned for the area.

The town has an Australian Rules football team (the Cats) competing in the Warrnambool & District Football League.

Allansford also hosts the final of the Sungold Cup. Which is a T20 competition consisted of they nearby leagues best teams.

Population
The most common responses for religion were No Religion 33.1% and Catholic 26.4%.

References

Towns in Victoria (Australia)
City of Warrnambool
Coastal towns in Victoria (Australia)